The 1971 Penn State Nittany Lions football team represented the Pennsylvania State University in the 1971 NCAA University Division football season. The team was coached by Joe Paterno and played its home games in Beaver Stadium in University Park, Pennsylvania.

Schedule

Roster

Game summaries

Air Force
Alberto Vitiello, a  junior college transfer, kicked a 22-yard field goal with four minutes to help Penn State escape with a 16–14 victory over Air Force.

Tennessee

NFL Draft
Four Nittany Lions were drafted in the 1972 NFL Draft.

References

Penn State
Penn State Nittany Lions football seasons
Lambert-Meadowlands Trophy seasons
Cotton Bowl Classic champion seasons
Penn State Nittany Lions football